Davin is an unincorporated community in Logan County, West Virginia, United States. Davin has a post office with ZIP code 25617. Davin's population is counted as part of the Mallory census-designated place.

The community was named after H. A. Davin, a railroad official.

References

Unincorporated communities in Logan County, West Virginia
Unincorporated communities in West Virginia